Railways with a railway track gauge of  first appeared in the United Kingdom and the United States. This gauge became commonly known as Russian gauge because the government of the Russian Empire later chose it in 1843 — former areas of the Empire have inherited this standard. In 1970, Soviet Railways re-defined the gauge as 1,520 mm.

History

Great Britain, 1748 

In 1748, the Wylam waggonway was built to a  gauge for the shipment of coal from Wylam to Lemington down the River Tyne.

In 1839, the Eastern Counties Railway was constructed; and in 1840, the Northern and Eastern Railway was built. In 1903, the East Hill Cliff Railway, a funicular, was opened.

United States, 1827 

In 1827, Horatio Allen, the chief engineer of the South Carolina Canal and Rail Road Company, prescribed the usage of  gauge and many other railroads in Southern United States adopted this gauge. The presence of several distinct gauges was a major disadvantage to the Confederate States of America during the American Civil War.

Russian Empire, 1842 

The first railway built in Russia was built in 1837 to  gauge for a 17 km long "experimental" line connecting Saint Petersburg with Tsarskoye Selo and Pavlovsk; the choice of gauge was influenced by Brunel's Great Western Railway which used .  The Tsarskoye Selo railway's success proved that a larger gauge could be viable for railways isolated from the extant  gauge Western European network.  

The second railway in the Russian Empire was the Warsaw–Vienna railway in Congress Poland, which commenced construction in 1840.  This was built to  standard gauge with the express intention of allowing through-freight trains into Austria-Hungary.  

The modern Russian railway network solidified around the Saint Petersburg–Moscow railway, built two years later (1842). There, the Tsar established a committee to recommend technical standards for the building of Russia's first major railway. The team included devotees of Franz Anton von Gerstner, who pushed to continue the Tsarskoye Selo gauge, but also engineer Pavel Melnikov and his consultant George Washington Whistler, a prominent American railway engineer.

At the time, questions of continuity with the European network did not arise; by the time difficulties arose in connecting the Prussian railroads to the Russian ones in Warsaw in the 1850s, it was too late to change.     

A persistent myth holds that Imperial Russia chose a gauge broader than standard gauge for military reasons, namely to prevent potential invaders from using the rail system. The Russian military recognized as early as 1841 that operations to disrupt railway track did not depend on the gauge, and should instead focus on destroying bridges and tunnels.

Expansion 

The 5-foot gauge became the standard in the whole Russian Empire and later the Soviet Union.

Russian engineers used it also on the Chinese Eastern Railway, built in the closing years of the 19th century across the Northeastern China entry to provide a shortcut for the Trans-Siberian Railway to Vladivostok. The railway's southern branch, from Harbin via Changchun to Lüshun, used Russian gauge, but as a result of the Russo-Japanese War of 1904-1905 its southernmost section (from Changchun to Lüshun) was lost to the Japanese, who promptly regauged it to standard gauge (after using the narrow  for a short time during the war). This formed a break of gauge between Changchun and Kuancheng (the station just to the north of Changchun, still in Russian hands), until the rest of the former Chinese Eastern Railway was converted to standard gauge, too (probably in the 1930s).

Unlike in South Manchuria, the Soviet Union's reconquest of southern Sakhalin from Japan did not result in regauging of the railway system. Southern Sakhalin has continued with the original Japanese  gauge simultaneously with the Russian gauge railway, constructed in the northern part of the island in 1930-1932 (Moskalvo-Okha). The railway has no fixed connection with the mainland, and before 2019 rail cars coming from the mainland port of Vanino on the Vanino-Kholmsk train ferry (operating since 1973) had to have their bogies changed in the Sakhalin port of Kholmsk. In 2004 and 2008 plans were put forward to convert it to the Russian gauge. The conversion was completed in 2019.

There were proposals in 2013 for north-south and east-west lines in Afghanistan, with construction to commence in 2013.

Panama, 1850 

The Panama Canal Railway, first constructed in ca. 1850, was built in  gauge. During canal construction (1904–1914), this same gauge was chosen for both construction traffic, canal operating services along the quays, and the newly routed commercial cross-isthmus railway. The original gauge was chosen under the influence of the pre-conversion southern United States railway companies. Nowadays, the electric manoeuvering locomotives along the locks (mules) still use the  gauge that was laid during canal construction.

Finland, 1862 

The first rail line in Finland was opened on 31 January 1862. Russian trains could not have run on Finnish tracks, because the Finnish loading gauge was narrower until the connection was made and the Finnish structure gauge was widened.

Technical

Redefinitions 

At the same time the tolerances were tightened. As the running gear (wheelsets) of the rolling stock remained unaltered, the result was an increased speed and stability. The conversion took place between 1970 and the beginning of the 1990s.

The redefinition did not mean that all the railways in Estonia were changed immediately. It was more a rule change, so that all renovated old tracks and new railways would be constructed in 1,524 mm gauge from then on. (See Track gauge in Estonia.)

Tolerances 

Finland allows its gauge to be 1,520–1,529 mm on first class lines (classes 1AA and 1A, speed 220–160 km/h).

If the gauge of the rolling stock is kept within certain limits, through running between  railways and Finnish  railways is allowed. Since both 1,520 and 1,524 mm are within tolerances, the difference is tolerable.

The gauge of the international high-speed train Allegro (Sm6) between Helsinki and St. Petersburg was specified as 1,522 mm.

Loading gauge 

The loading gauge, which defines the maximum height and width for railway vehicles and their loads, is larger for Russian gauge. This means that if a standard gauge railway, in Europe, is adapted for dual gauge, bridges must be rebuilt, double tracks must be placed further apart and the overhead wire must be raised. Or there must be restrictions on permitted rolling stock, which would restrict the benefit of such a railway. Dual gauge needs more width than single gauge. For standard gauge railways, double stacking maximum height shall be . This would apply to Russia and Europe (or North America), rather than to Russia and China (or Iran).

Current status

Primary usage 
The primary countries currently using the gauge, include:

Extended usage 

Short sections of Russian gauge extend into Poland, eastern Slovakia, Sweden (at the Finnish border at Haparanda), and northern Afghanistan.

There is an approximately 150 km long section in Hungary in the Záhony logistics area close to the Ukrainian border.

Following renovations in 2014, a 32 km section of dual Standard/Russian gauge was installed between Tumangang and Rajin stations in North Korea.

The most western  gauge railway is the Polish LHS (Linia Hutnicza Szerokotorowa) from the Ukrainian border to the eastern end of the Silesian conurbation.

Use in rapid transit and light rail systems 

Many tramway networks initially built to narrow gauges ( or ) were converted to broad gauge. As of 2015, only a few out of more than sixty tram systems in Russia are not broad gauge:  in Kaliningrad and Pyatigorsk,  in Rostov-on-Don; there are also two tram systems in and around Yevpatoria that use  gauge. Finland's Helsinki trams and Latvia's Liepāja trams also use , and Estonia's Tallinn trams use similar . Warsaw's tramway system, constructed with 1525 mm gauge, was regauged to 1435 mm during post-WWII reconstruction. Tampere tramway, built in 2021, uses .

Underground urban rapid transit systems in the former USSR and Finland, like the Moscow Metro, Saint Petersburg Metro, Kyiv Metro, Yerevan Metro and the Helsinki Metro use Russian gauge or  gauge.

Similar gauges 

These gauges cannot make 3-rail dual gauge with Russian gauge.
 Indian gauge
 Iberian gauge
 Irish gauge
 standard gauge

These gauges are within tolerance.

  as used by Helsinki Metro
Dual gauge between Russian gauge and another similar gauge can make these bonus gauges.
1,829 mm (6 ft)

2,134 mm (7 ft)
2,140 mm    (Brunel gauge)
2,503 mm (8 ft 2 in) (The maximum bonus gauge from the  standard gauge gauntlet tracks).

Summary

Railways using 1,524 mm gauge

Railways using 1,520 mm gauge

See also 

 The Museum of the Moscow Railway

Notes

References

External links 

1520 Strategic Partnership www.forum1520.com
 www.parovoz.com
 www.etla.fi

Rail infrastructure in Russia